Death and Taxes may refer to:

Idiom
Death and taxes (idiom), a reference to a quotation by Benjamin Franklin

Literature 
 Death and Taxes, a 1931 poetry collection by Dorothy Parker
 Death and Taxes, the 1941 debut novel by David F. Dodge
 Death and Taxes, a 1967 novel by Thomas B. Dewey
 Death and Taxes, a 1976 book by Hans Sennholz
 Death and Taxes, a 1990 comic by Frank Miller; see Give Me Liberty
 Lobo: Death & Taxes, a 1996 comic book miniseries; see List of DC Comics publications
 Groo: Death & Taxes, a comic book miniseries; see Groo the Wanderer

Media

Film 
 Death and Taxes, title of a fictional book written by one of the characters in Stranger than Fiction (2006)
 Death & Taxes (film), a 1993 Jeffery J. Jackson documentary film about Gordon Kahl

Video game 
 Death and Taxes (video game), a 2020 video game

Music 
 "Death and Taxes", a song on the 2000 Kid Dynamite album Shorter, Faster, Louder
 Death & Taxes, a 64k Intro winner of the Scene.org Awards
 "Life After Death and Taxes (Failure II)", a Relient K song
 "Death and Taxes", a Daniel Caesar song

Television 
 "Death and Taxes", a 1959 episode of Bat Masterson (TV series)
 "Death and Taxes", a 1986 episode of Magnum, P.I.; see List of Magnum, P.I. episodes
 "Death and Taxes'" a 1990 episode of Mancuso, F.B.I.
 "Death and Taxes", a 1991 episode of Zorro; see List of Zorro episodes (1990 series)
 "Death and Taxes", a 1994 episode of The Bill; see List of The Bill episodes (series 10)
 "Death and Taxes", a 1999 episode of Twice in a Lifetime
 "Death and Taxes", a 2001 episode of Blue Murder; see List of Blue Murder episodes
 "Death and Taxes", a 2003 episode of ER; see ER (season 10)
 "Death & Taxes", a Death & Taxes", a 2007 episode of Theme Time Radio Hour; see Theme Time Radio Hour Season One
 Death and Taxes: Joe Stack's Attack on the IRS, a 2010 CNN TV documentary about the 2010 Austin suicide attack

Websites 
 Death and Taxes, a music and culture website owned by Prometheus Global Media

Products 
 Death & Taxes, a beer produced by Moonlight Brewing Company